Terry L. Wooten (born 1954) is a senior United States district judge of the United States District Court for the District of South Carolina.

Education and career

Born in Louisville, Kentucky, Wooten received a Bachelor of Arts degree from the University of South Carolina in 1976 and a Juris Doctor from the University of South Carolina School of Law in 1980. He was in private practice in South Carolina from 1980 to 1982. He was an Assistant Solicitor, Richland County, South Carolina, from 1982 to 1986. He was a Chief counsel, United States Senate Judiciary Committee from 1986 to 1991. He was an Assistant United States Attorney of the United States Attorney's Office, District of South Carolina from 1992 to 1999.

District court service

Wooten was nominated by President George W. Bush on September 4, 2001, to a new seat created by 114 Stat. 2762. He was confirmed by the United States Senate on November 8, 2001, and received his commission on November 26, 2001. He became Chief Judge on January 16, 2013. He assumed senior status on February 28, 2019.

Sources
 

1954 births
Living people
Assistant United States Attorneys
Judges of the United States District Court for the District of South Carolina
United States district court judges appointed by George W. Bush
21st-century American judges
Lawyers from Louisville, Kentucky
United States magistrate judges
University of South Carolina alumni
University of South Carolina School of Law alumni